Lankesterella is a genus of flowering plants from the orchid family, Orchidaceae. It is found mostly in South America, with a few species extending north into Cuba, the Dominican Republic and Costa Rica.

Species
Species currently recognized as of June 2014:

Lankesterella alainii Nir -  Cuba, Dominican Republic 
Lankesterella caespitosa (Lindl.) Hoehne - Venezuela, Brazil
Lankesterella ceracifolia (Barb.Rodr.) Mansf. - Venezuela, Brazil, Paraguay, Argentina
Lankesterella glandula Ackerman -  Dominican Republic 
Lankesterella gnomus (Kraenzl.) Hoehne - Brazil
Lankesterella longicollis (Cogn.) Hoehne - Brazil
Lankesterella orthantha (Kraenzl.) Garay - Costa Rica, Venezuela, Colombia, Ecuador, Peru
Lankesterella parvula (Kraenzl.) Pabst - Rio de Janeiro
Lankesterella pilosa (Cogn.) Hoehne - Rio de Janeiro
Lankesterella salehi Pabst - Brazil
Lankesterella spannageliana (Hoehne & Brade) Mansf.  - Rio de Janeiro

See also 
 List of Orchidaceae genera

References 

 Pridgeon, A.M., Cribb, P.J., Chase, M.A. & Rasmussen, F. eds. (2003). Genera Orchidacearum 3. 217 ff. Oxford Univ. Press
 Berg Pana, H. 2005. Handbuch der Orchideen-Namen. Dictionary of Orchid Names. Dizionario dei nomi delle orchidee. Ulmer, Stuttgart

External links 

Cranichideae genera
Spiranthinae
Orchids of the Caribbean
Orchids of Central America
Orchids of South America